Priscilla M. Wehi  is a New Zealand ethnobiologist and conservation biologist. As at July 2021 she is an associate professor at the University of Otago and on the first of that month officially undertook the role of director of Te Pūnaha Matatini, a centre of research excellence in complex systems and data analytics. During the COVID-19 pandemic in New Zealand Te Pūnaha Matatini scientists have developed mathematical models of the spread of the virus across the country that influence the New Zealand government's response to the outbreak. In 2021 Wehi was awarded the Hill Tinsley Medal.

Education 
Wehi undertook her PhD at the University of Waikato's School of Māori and Pacific Development. Her doctoral thesis was entitled Harakeke (Phormium tenax) ecology and historical management by Maori: The changing landscape in New Zealand.

Career 
After completing her PhD Wehi obtained positions at several research institutions including at Massey University (working with Mary Morgan-Richards) and the University of Otago. She was then employed at Manaaki Whenua Landcare Research where she undertook research into wētā, and advocated for the use of indigenous knowledge to inform research into biodiversity.  Wehi also led a team of researchers at Manaaki Whenua Landcare Research and Te Rūnanga o Ngāi Tahu investigating Māori exploration of Antarctic waters. Their research suggested that Māori were possibly the first people to sight the continent of Antarctica.  As at July 2021, Wehi is an associate professor at the University of Otago.

Awards 
In 2014 Wehi was granted a Royal Society Te Apārangi  Rutherford Discovery Fellowship. In 2019 Wehi was a recipient of the Outstanding Publication on New Zealand Ecology award, conferred by the New Zealand Ecological Society. In 2020 the biological sciences department of the University of Canterbury awarded Wehi their Inspirational Alumna Award. In 2021 Wehi was awarded the Hill Tinsley Medal with the New Zealand Association of Scientists recognising Wehi's "pioneering innovative research at the intersection of science and indigenous knowledge".

Selected publications

References

External links 

 Video featuring Dr Wehi and her research into flax
 Dr Wehi interviewed on RNZ Morning Report 9 June 2021

Year of birth missing (living people)
University of Waikato alumni
Academic staff of the University of Otago
New Zealand biologists
Place of birth missing (living people)
Living people
New Zealand ecologists
Women ecologists